In mathematics and computer science, truncation is limiting the number of digits right of the decimal point.

Truncation and floor function 

Truncation of positive real numbers can be done using the floor function.

However, for negative numbers truncation does not round in the same direction as the floor function: truncation always rounds toward zero, the floor function rounds towards negative infinity. For a given number , the function ceil is used instead.

See Notation of floor and ceiling functions.

Causes of truncation 
With computers, truncation can occur when a decimal number is typecast as an integer; it is truncated to zero decimal digits because integers cannot store non-integer real numbers.

In algebra 
An analogue of truncation can be applied to polynomials. In this case, the truncation of a polynomial P to degree n can be defined as the sum of all terms of P of degree n or less. Polynomial truncations arise in the study of Taylor polynomials, for example.

See also 
 Arithmetic precision
 Quantization (signal processing)
 Precision (computer science)
 Truncation (statistics)

References

External links 
 Wall paper applet that visualizes errors due to finite precision

Numerical analysis

ja:端数処理